Anthony Fleet (born 6 September 1965) is an Australian former professional darts player who competed in events of the BDO/WDF.

Career 
Born in Canberra, Fleet qualified for the 2007 PDC World Darts Championship, but was defeated 3-0 by Adrian Lewis in the first round.

In 2009, Fleet won the Pacific Masters, and the WDF World Cup pairs with Geoff Kime.

Fleet qualified to play in the 2010 BDO World Championships at the Lakeside Country Club where he was drawn against the 2007 World Champion Martin Adams. In 27 darts, Fleet scored 26, 41, 60, 60, 5, 41 (with his first dart hitting double 1), 22, 80 and 11, and it is largely considered to be "the worst leg in darts history". Adams also struggled to get going in the leg, missing 4 darts at a double before finally finishing on double 3. Fleet achieved a 3-dart average of 65.34 (one of the lowest recorded averages in the history of a major competition), and lost 3–0 in sets without winning a leg. Adams later spoke of his sympathy for Fleet and recalled his nerves the first time he played at the Lakeside saying that "no one knows what its like up there until you get up there."

World Championship results

PDC 
 2007: First round: (lost to Adrian Lewis 0–3)

BDO 
 2010: First round: (lost to Martin Adams 0–3)

External links 
Profile and stats on Darts Database

References 

Australian darts players
1965 births
Living people
People from Canberra
Professional Darts Corporation associate players
British Darts Organisation players